This is chronological list of adventure films split by decade. Often there may be considerable overlap particularly between adventure and other genres (including, action, drama, and fantasy films); the list documents films which are more closely related to adventure, even if they bend genres.

Films by decade
List of adventure films before 1920
List of adventure films of the 1920s
List of adventure films of the 1930s
List of adventure films of the 1940s
List of adventure films of the 1950s
List of adventure films of the 1960s
List of adventure films of the 1970s
List of adventure films of the 1980s
List of adventure films of the 1990s
List of adventure films of the 2000s
List of adventure films of the 2010s
List of adventure films of the 2020s

See also 
Epic film
List of pirate films
Road films
Swashbuckler films
Superhero film
Survival film

Lists of films by genre